Stenocercus doellojuradoi is a species of lizard in the family Tropiduridae. The species is native to southeastern South America.

Etymology
The specific name, doellojuradoi, is in honor of Argentine zoologist Martín Doello-Jurado.

Geographic range
S. doellojuradoi is found in Argentina and Paraguay.

Habitat

Reproduction
S. doellojuradoi is oviparous.

References

Further reading
Carosini, Alberto; Bueno-Villafañe, Diego; Caballero Gini, Andrea; Netto, Flavia (2021). "First formal records of Stenocercus doellojuradoi (Freiberg, 1944) (Squamata, Tropiduridae) from the Paraguayan Chaco". Cuadernos de Herpetología 35 (1): 183–185.
Freiberg MA (1944). "Una nueva especie de saurio del género Proctotretus Duméril & Bibron ". Physis, Buenos Aires 19: 473–477. (Proctotretus doellojuradoi, new species). (in Spanish)
Freiberg MA (1962). "Nuevos hallazgos y distribución geográfica del saurio Proctotretus doello-juradoi [sic] Freiberg en la Argentina ". Revista del Museo Argentino de Ciencias Naturales "Bernardino Rivadavia" 8 (9): 107–111. (in Spanish).
Frost DR (1992). "Phylogenetic analysis and taxonomy of the Tropidurus group of lizards (Iguania: Tropiduridae)". American Museum Novitates (3033): 1–68. (Stenocercus doellojuradoi, new combination).

Stenocercus
Reptiles described in 1944
Reptiles of Argentina
Reptiles of Paraguay